Isolona congolana is a species of plant in the Annonaceae family. It is found in the Democratic Republic of the Congo and Uganda. It has also recently been found in southern Africa.

References

congolana
Flora of the Democratic Republic of the Congo
Flora of Uganda
Near threatened flora of Africa
Taxonomy articles created by Polbot
Taxa named by Émile Auguste Joseph De Wildeman
Taxa named by Théophile Alexis Durand